High Society is a 2014 French romantic drama film written and directed by Julie Lopes-Curval. The film stars Ana Girardot, Bastien Bouillon and Baptiste Lecaplain. It was selected to be screened in the Contemporary World Cinema section at the 2014 Toronto International Film Festival. In January 2015, the film received two nominations at the 20th Lumières Awards.

Cast 

Ana Girardot as Alice 
Bastien Bouillon as Antoine 
Baptiste Lecaplain as Kevin
Aurélia Petit as Agnès 
Sergi López as Harold 
India Hair as Manon 
Stéphane Bissot as Christiane  
Jean-Noël Brouté as Monsieur Jacquard  
Michèle Gleizer as Arlette
David Houri as Rodolphe
Blanche Cluzet as Catherine
Cécile Bernot as Déborah
Lawrence Valin as Martin

References

External links 
 

2014 films
2014 romantic drama films
2010s French-language films
Films directed by Julie Lopes-Curval
French romantic drama films
2010s French films